John Paul Pultz Pinnerup Axelsen (born 23 January 1998) is a Danish professional golfer who plays on the European Tour. He was a member of the Danish team that won the Eisenhower Trophy in 2018. He has won four times on the Nordic Golf League as well as winning the Nordic Golf League Order of Merit in 2022.

Amateur career
Axelsen was born in Holbæk, Denmark and was introduced to golf by his father when he was 5. At a young age, Axelsen showed considerable talent, winning English boys under-13 (Reid Trophy) and medals at the European Boys under-16 championship (European Young Masters) in 2012, 2013 and 2014.

In 2014, Axelsen was the first Danish boy to play in the Junior Ryder Cup, after winning the McGregor Trophy during which he set a new course record at Radcliffe-on-Trent Golf Club and also a new tournament record. In 2016 he was selected again but opted instead to play for Denmark at the Eisenhower Trophy in Cancun, Mexico.

At the age of 16, Axelsen was selected as the youngest-ever male player to play for the Danish National Men's team at the European Amateur Team Championship in Finland. He twice won bronze at the European Team Championship with the Danish team, in 2016 and 2018.

Axelsen won the Danish International Amateur Championship three times, in 2014, 2017 and 2018, becoming the first player to win the event three times. In 2016, Axelsen received a wild card to the Made in Denmark event on the European Tour. He made the cut and finished 40th at 282, 2-under-par.

Axelsen was a member of the first Danish team to win the World Amateur Team Championship (Eisenhower Trophy) in 2018 in Ireland together with brothers Rasmus Højgaard and  Nicolai Højgaard. During the event he shot the event's lowest round of 8 under par.
Axelsen was the joint lowest scorer in the stroke-play qualification for the 2019 Amateur Championship at Portmarnock Golf Club in Ireland.

As an amateur he was the number one ranked player European Golf Rankings at under-14, under-16, under-18, under-21 and ranked second in the men's rankings before turning professional. He was also ranked number one in the Danish Golf Union Rankings at under-16, under-18, under-21 and men's level, where he already as 16 was the highest ranked men's player in Denmark 

Axelsen attended the University of Florida from 2017 to May 2020, leaving before his senior year to turn professional. He was part of both Golfweeks NCAA All-American Team, First team and GCAA's NCAA Division I All-American Team, First team, with the second-best scoring average in University of Florida's program history.

Professional career
Axelsen won the Destination Fyn Pro-Am finale in September 2020 en route to being named Rookie of The Year on the Danish Golf Tour.

Axelsen won the Made in HimmerLand Qualifier on the 2021 Nordic Golf League. With the win, Axelsen qualified as no 3 on the 2021 Race to HimmerLand Ranking 2021; earning a place in the Made in HimmerLand on the European Tour.

Axelsen won three times on the 2022 Nordic Golf League, including a victory at the MoreGolf Mastercard Tour Final in October. He went on to win the Order of Merit and secure status on the 2023 Challenge Tour. In November, Axelsen entered the European Tour Q School. After six rounds he finished tied-seventh place, ultimately gaining a card for the 2023 European Tour season, bettering his original Challenge Tour status which he gained via the Nordic Golf League.

Awards
Professional

Rookie of the year, Danish Golf Tour: 2020

Amateur
Santandar Consumer Bank Talent Award: 2019
Den Gyldne Golfbold: 2018
Bella prisen: 2014 og 2015
Toms Guld Barre prisen: 2013

College
Golfweeks All-American Team, First team: 2020
GCAA's NCAA Division I All-America Team, First team: 2020
All-SEC First Team: 2020
PING All-Region Honors: 2020
Haskins Awards final nominated players for men's college player of the year: 2020
PING All-Region Honors: 2019
All-SEC Freshman Team: 2018

Amateur wins
2011 Reid Trophy, English Boys u/13
2012 Zeagul Trophy
2013 Zeagul Trophy, DGU Elite Tour Herrer Finale
2014 Asserbo Pokalen, Danish International Amateur, McGregor Trophy
2015 DGU Elite Tour Herrer Finale
2016 DGU Elite Tour Finale Herrer & Drenge
2017 Danish International Amateur
2018 Danish International Amateur

Professional wins (5)

Nordic Golf League wins (4)

Danish Golf Tour wins (1)

Team appearances
Amateur
European Boys' Team Championship (representing Denmark): 2012, 2013, 2015
European Amateur Team Championship (representing Denmark): 2014, 2016, 2017, 2018, 2019
Youth Olympics (representing Denmark): 2014
Junior Ryder Cup (representing Europe): 2014
Jacques Léglise Trophy (representing Continental Europe): 2015 (tie)
Eisenhower Trophy (representing Denmark): 2016, 2018 (winners)

See also
2022 European Tour Qualifying School graduates

References

External links

Danish male golfers
European Tour golfers
Florida Gators men's golfers
Sportspeople from Region Zealand
People from Holbæk Municipality
1998 births
Living people